Turbat (Urdu and ) is a city in southern Balochistan, Pakistan, and the administrative centre of Kech District. Situated on the Kech River Turbat was the historical capital of the State of Makran. Turbat is the second-largest city in Balochistan after Quetta and 38th largest city of Pakistan. It is the largest city in the southern part of the province.

Education

University:
 University of Turbat
 Balochistan University of Engineering & Technology, Turbat Campus
Colleges:
 Makran Medical College
 Government Atta Shad Degree College
 Government Girls Degree College
 Balochistan Residential College
Government Schools:
 Government High School Chahsar
 Modal School Turbat
 Government High School Absar
Private Schools:
 Tameer-e-Millat High School Absor
 Sayed Hashmi High School
 Delta School
 Kech Grammar School
 Bolan School
Layaqat English Public School LEPS
Oxford Grammar School

Climate
Turbat is one of the hottest cities in South Asia, and is counted as the world's fourth hottest place, having recorded temperatures as high as 53.5 degrees Celsius. On May 28, 2017, temperatures hit 128.7 degrees Fahrenheit (53.7 Celsius, plus or minus 0.4 degrees uncertainty), placing it among the four hottest temperatures recorded on earth, according to the WMO.

Overview
The town is located in southern Balochistan province in Pakistan. It is situated on the left bank of the Kech River which is a tributary to the Dasht River. The Makran Range to the north and east descends to the coastal plains in the south. The town is a marketplace for dates grown in the surrounding region and has a date-processing factory. Jowar (sorghum), barley, wheat, and rice are also grown, and livestock are raised.

Koh-e-Murad is a shrine located in Turbat. This is a sacred place for Zikris. They believe that Mahdi the 12th imam had travelled to this place, and offered prayers for a long time. The followers of Zikri sect gather here annually on the night of 27th Ramadan for a ritual visit to this shrine. And Turbat also has multilingual singers.

The town has a special place in Baloch folklore and literatures as it is the home of Punnu, hero of the romance of Sassi Punnun. The remains of Punnu's fort can still be seen at Turbat.

Atta Shad, who is considered one of the greatest poets of Balochi literature was also born in Singanisar, a town in Turbat city. He was not only versatile in Balochi poetry, but he was also greatly appreciated for his contribution in Urdu poetry. He was unique in his diction and style. He is credited to have written four books that include two Balochi books, Rochgir and Shap sahar indem, and two Urdu books, Singaab and Barfag. He died on 13 February 1998 in Quetta, the capital of Balochistan province.

Turbat is the birthplace of Qadir Bukhsh Rind Baloch alias Kadu Makrani was a 19th-century archetypal figure who was born and brought up in Makran, Balochistan. He rose as an insurgent in Kathiawar, Gujarat, martyred and buried in Karachi, Sindh in 1887. His final resting place in Mewa Shah Graveyard (Lyari) which has become the center of inspiration today. He is also remembered as the eastern Robin Hood.

Koh-e-Imam lake is a Holy Place, its mountainous range stretches more than 15–25 km from main Kech (Turbat) City. Where you find many picnic points as there are many natural water reservoirs, during rainy seasons.
In koh-e-imam there are also centuries old tombs we call them DAMD in Balochi Language. They are mysterious in a sense that people still don't find facts about the tombs aside of the river which is almost more than 100 km.

Besides, Turbat is considered to be one of the main hubs of separatist insurgent groups active against Pakistani armed forces and the development projects running under the China-Pakistan Economic Corridor. The city has also witnessed violence against non-local men who have either come for business or serving government officials from other parts of Pakistan mostly from the Punjab province. The city has come under discussion on media because of the attacks on non-local men or labourers of companies working on development projects. The city holds many military check points at the surroundings because of the security situation affected by the separatist insurgency. The security situation is now much improved.

The city is one of the most significant cities of Balochistan as the important Gwadar port is 180 km away from the town. Gwadaris linked by the highway recently developed and improved under CPEC project. Turbat has an international airport that has many flights to the Gulf states of Oman, the UAE and Qatar. Although the city is not coastal but still has a newly built Pakistan Navy base camp which is being expanded to become a major air base in the future supporting Karachi. Turbat on its extreme South links with another coastal city of Pasni that comes administratively under district Gwadar. In the Northwest it shares a border with Iran 120 km away. The town members have a visa-free entry to Iran as many members have relatives at the Iranian side of the border. Diesel smuggling from the Iranian border remains one of the major source of income in the town that is smuggled to Karachi. The power line that feeds Turbat comes from Iran and the market is heavily filled by Iranian products.

History
In the 12th century, Turbat and its surrounding areas along with Iranian Makkuran were ruled by Prince Punnu(Mir Dosthein) and his father and his uncle Prince Aali khan and Prince Khosag Khan. Later, Turbat was ruled by the Gichki Tribes of Makran and as well ruled by the Buledi Tribe about 400 years ago.
It was then the headquarters of the Makran State and the Nawab of Makran resided in Shahi Tump near Turbat. When Makran State was dissolved, Turbat city remained the Division Headquarters. Turbat means "place of lovers". It has different historical places and associated stories.

Places of interest
 Hapdrok River
 Kech River 
 Former palace of the Nawab of Makran
 The Nazim's Mosque
 The Government's Farm
 Fort of Punno, commonly known as meri-e-kalat.
 Absor, a very important union council turbat town of the District Kech, Koh-e-Murad and Date Research Farm, Agriculture Research Farm, Peegambar e aap, Maasit e Kunch, Dukurm Delay Action Dam are important places in Absor.
 apdrok river is a river that is joined on the south side by mountain waters and on the other side by the kechkor river.
 Mirani Dam
 Dasht Sangai
 Absor (Askani Bazar)(Saeed Abad Soro)
 Kech Kaur (river)
 Koh-e-Imam Gwarm (lake)
 Pakistan and Iran Border

Since 2016 there is a VLF transmission facility of the Pakistani Navy near Turbat for sending messages to submerged submarines.

Transport
Turbat has an international airport which offers direct flights to Gwadar, Karachi, and Sharjah, UAE. The road network links Turbat with Kalat and Quetta to the northeast, Gwadar and Pasni to the south, Chabahar and Iranshahr to the west, and Karachi to the east.

See also
 Turbat International Airport
 Turbat Market and shopping center
 Gwadar
 Gwadar International Airport

References

Populated places in Kech District